Bucay, officially the Municipality of Bucay, is a 3rd class municipality in the province of Abra, Philippines. According to the 2020 census, it has a population of 17,953 people.

History

Bucay was established on October 29, 1846, and the first settlers were Itnegs. It became the first provincial capital of Abra when the military form of government was set up in May 1847. At the back of the present municipal hall is the centuries-old façade of the ruined Casa Real (Provincial Capitol Building). Across the town plaza, stand the centuries-old Catholic church, convent and learning school, the Spanish structure house owned by then Don Teodoro Arias who served as Gobernadorcillo of Bucay in 1862, and the old American structure house which was built in 1908 and owned by then US Corporal Ernest D. Smith who served the Spanish–American War and the Filipino-American war from 1896 to 1901. Prior to Spanish Colonization, the place had become the footfalls of invading headhunters from the dense jungles of the Cordillera range.

There are two versions of how this town got its name "Bucay". Some residents say that there was a tribe leader by the name of Bucay. When this leader was still young, while patrolling, he found a pretty young lass lying on the way which prompted him to extend assistance, and brought her home. After a period of time, he developed his love for the young lass and took her as his wife. On several occasions, the girl suddenly disappeared. In some instances, Bucay used to see her at the corner of his bamboo hut sitting alone with her bowed head which prompted him to approach and touch her but always disappeared.

Geography
It is bounded on the north by the towns of Tayum and Lagangilang, on the south by Manabo, on the east by Licuan-Baay and Sallapadan, and on the west by Peñarrubia, Bangued and Villaviciosa.

According to the Philippine Statistics Authority, the municipality has a land area of  constituting  of the  total area of Abra.

Barangays
Bucay is politically subdivided into 21 barangays. These barangays are headed by elected officials: Barangay Captain, Barangay Council, whose members are called Barangay Councilors. All are elected every three years.

Climate

Demographics

In the 2020 census, Bucay had a population of 17,953.

Economy

Government
Bucay, belonging to the lone congressional district of the province of Abra, is governed by a mayor designated as its local chief executive and by a municipal council as its legislative body in accordance with the Local Government Code. The mayor, vice mayor, and the councilors are elected directly by the people through an election which is being held every three years.

Elected officials

References

External links

 [ Philippine Standard Geographic Code]

Municipalities of Abra (province)
Populated places on the Abra River